Lichtgestalt is a 2005 album by German gothic rock duo Lacrimosa. The album was released on 2 May 2005 by Hall of Sermon.

Music 
Recorded in 2005, it consists of 9 tracks, including the two different versions of "The Party Is Over". The album has strong elements of symphonic metal. The album continues in the musical vein of Lacrimosa's previous albums, in contrast to Tilo Wolff's other musical project, Snakeskin.

The style changes between calm songs with string instruments and aggressive electric guitar tracks.

Lyrics cover Lacrimosa's by-now standard themes of love, estrangement and loneliness. A notable exception is the last individual track, "Hohelied der Liebe", a song written entirely for orchestra and choir with rock elements, and with lyrics taken from St Paul's First Epistle to the Corinthians.

Track listing

Charts

Credits 
All songs written, composed, arranged, orchestrated & produced by Tilo Wolff except the lyrics of "Hohelied der Liebe" taken from the Holy Bible.
Arranged By, Composed By, Orchestrated By, Producer, Written-By – Tilo Wolff
Bass – Yenz Leonhardt (tracks: 7) 
Bass [Fretless] – Susanne Vogel (tracks: 5) 
Bassoon – Philip Kreinert (tracks: 1) 
Cello – Boris Matchin (tracks: 4) 
Choir – Arno Schubert (tracks: 8), Christian Hammerschick (tracks: 8), Kanemaki Chor (tracks: 8), Rosenberg Ensemble (tracks: 8), Thomas Günther (tracks: 8) 
Clarinet – Thomas Gramatzki (tracks: 1, 4) 
Conductor [Spielmann-schnyder Philharmonie] – Christopher Clayton (tracks: 3, 5, 7) 
Conductor [Victor Smolski Symphonic Orchestra] – Andrey Zubrich (tracks: 2, 8) 
Double Bass – Katharina C. Bunners (tracks: 4) 
Drums – AC (2) (tracks: 4, 8), Manne Uhlig (tracks: 2, 3, 5 to 7), Thomas Nack (tracks: 1) 
Flute – Thomas Gramatzki (tracks: 6) 
Guitar – Sascha Gerbig (tracks: 5) 
Guitar, Bass – Jay P. (3) 
Oboe – Thomas Rohde (tracks: 1, 4, 5, 6) 
Orchestra – Spielmann-Schnyder Philharmonie* (tracks: 3, 5, 7), Victor Smolski Symphonic Orchestra (tracks: 2, 8)

Viola – Thomas Oepen (tracks: 4) 
Viola [Da Gamba], Cello – Birte Schultz (tracks: 8) 
Violin [1st] – Stefan Pintev (tracks: 4) 
Violin [2nd] – Rodrigo Reichel (tracks: 4) 
Vocals, Keyboards – Anne Nurmi 
Vocals, Piano, Programmed By, Trumpet – Tilo Wolff

References 

Lacrimosa (band) albums
2005 albums